Samuel Stamps (October 19, 1795 - March 22, 1850) was an American Democratic politician. He was the 9th Secretary of State of Mississippi, serving from 1847 until his death.

Biography 
Samuel Stamps was born on October 19, 1795, in Hancock County, Georgia. He was a member of the Democratic party. Stamps became the Secretary of State of Mississippi in January 1847. While still serving as Secretary, he died on March 22 (or at the evening of March 21), 1850, at his residence in Jackson, Mississippi. He was succeeded as Secretary of State of Mississippi by Joseph Bell.

References 

1795 births
1850 deaths
Secretaries of State of Mississippi
People from Jackson, Mississippi
Mississippi Democrats